Christian Fenger (November 3, 1840 – March 7, 1902) was a Danish-born surgeon, pathologist, and medical instructor. In the later half of his life, he worked at several medical institutions in Chicago, and became one of the most highly regarded surgeons in the United States.

Early life and education 
Born to a farming family, Fenger studied engineering at the Copenhagen Polytechnic Institute before his father convinced him to pursue a medical degree at the University of Copenhagen. He gained experience as a surgeon during the Danish-Prussian War and Franco-Prussian War and received his MD in 1874.

Career 
From 1875 to 1877, Fenger worked in Egypt, where he studied trachoma and schistosomiasis. However, he did not cope well with the Egyptian climate, and at the advice of a group of Americans he met in Cairo, he set off for the United States. He eventually settled in Chicago, which had a prominent Scandinavian community.

Fenger was invited to perform some autopsies at Cook County Hospital, and soon joined that hospital's surgical staff with a distinguished record conducting experimental skin grafts. He worked there until 1893, while also holding various teaching positions at the Chicago Medical College and the College of Physicians and Surgeons of Chicago. From 1893 to 1899, Fenger worked as chair of surgery at the Chicago Medical College; he then became a professor of surgery at Rush Medical College. Fenger's lectures were very popular, and over the years, he trained several prominent physicians, including William James Mayo, Charles Horace Mayo, Nicholas Senn, James B. Herrick, Ludvig Hektoen, and Howard Taylor Ricketts.

In Chicago, Fenger helped demonstrate the bacterial origins of endocarditis and developed techniques for cleft palate repair, vaginal hysterectomy, and the relief of ureteral strictures. He also became one of the first surgeons to remove an intramedullary tumor from the spinal cord. He performed thousands of autopsies, and used his knowledge of about twelve languages to keep abreast of medical literature. A writer in the Journal of the American Medical Association declared, "There is nothing that he has written, at least nothing with which we are familiar, that does not contain something of value, valuable at least for the time at which it was produced."

Awards and honors 
In 1901, Fenger was named to the Order of the Dannebrog by the king of Denmark. He died of pneumonia a year later. Christian Fenger Academy High School in Chicago is named in his honor.

References

External links
 

1840 births
1902 deaths
Danish surgeons
Danish pathologists
Order of the Dannebrog
Rush Medical College faculty
Northwestern University faculty
University of Copenhagen alumni
Danish emigrants to the United States
Deaths from pneumonia in the United States